Red Skirts on Clydeside, produced in 1984, is the fifth documentary film made by the Sheffield Film Cooperative. It follows the process of rediscovering women's histories, focusing on the Glasgow Rent Strikes of 1915 and four of the women involved: Helen Crawfurd, Agnes Dollan, Mary Barbour, Jean Fergusson.

The title plays on the name Red Clydeside, given to the period of political radicalism in Glasgow and other urban areas along the River Clyde during the 1910s, 1920s and 1930s, but suggesting the involvement of women.

Synopsis 

The film follows the literal and metaphorical journey of the filmmakers as they attempt to unearth the details of women's political involvement in the Glasgow Rent Strikes, by visiting archives in Glasgow and London and through oral history interviews with several Glaswegian women who recall the period. We are shown both how women's contributions are often undervalued by archives and how personal narratives from marginalised voices can enrich our understanding of events.

The film's interviews with descendants of the strikers establish the link between the Glasgow Rent Strike and the women's movement of the 1910s. The extent of this mobilisation of women offers evidence of the political nature and potential of a supposedly "unpolitical hearth". The film's focus is on personal accounts rather than the wider context of the women's movement, class struggle and politics. The interviewees describe their own lives and education as an informed and highly conscious political upbringing.

Participants 

The filmmakers speak to seven women during the course of the film.

 Jessie Findley - ″a political activist all her life″
 Margaret Young, Kathy Mailer, Sadie Fulton - their ″parents were politically active during the period″
 Mary and Jessie Barbour - granddaughters of Mary Barbour
 Elspeth King - ″a feminist historian, [who] had researched the early Scottish women’s movement″ and curator at The People’s Palace in Glasgow, which ″has a collection of suffrage material″

Funding 

The production cost around £55,800 and funding was received from several sources, including the British Film Institute, Sheffield City Council and income generated by the Co-Op's speaking and distribution fees.

References

External links 

 Recording of a discussion after a screening of the film at the Pearce Institute, Govan (2015-06-04)

1984 documentary films
1984 films
British independent films
Documentary films about British politics
Documentary films about feminism
English-language Scottish films
Scottish documentary films
Films shot in Scotland
1980s English-language films
1980s British films